George B. Clarke (24 July 1900 – 11 February 1977) was an English professional footballer, who played as an outside left in the Football League for Aston Villa, Crystal Palace and Queens Park Rangers. He also played non-league football for Mansfield Town and Folkestone.

Playing career
Clarke began his playing career with Mansfield Town, at that time a non-league team, having previously worked as a miner at Welbeck Colliery. In 1922, Aston Villa paid £500 to sign him but his sole Villa appearance was not made until February 1925, and in May 1925, he was signed by former Aston Villa reserve player and then Crystal Palace manager, Edmund Goodman. In his first season with Crystal Palace, Clarke missed only one game and remained a fixture in the side for the next seven seasons. His 98 goals, as a winger, for Palace has only been exceeded by central strikers, but his main contribution was as a creator of scoring chances; supplying opportunities for the main strikers, particularly Peter Simpson.

In the 1933 close season, Clarke moved to Queens Park Rangers but remained there for only one season, before moving into non-league football with Folkestone.

George Clarke died on 11 February 1977 aged 76.

References

External links
George Clarke at holmesdale.net

1900 births
1977 deaths
People from Bolsover
Footballers from Derbyshire
English footballers
Association football midfielders
English Football League players
Mansfield Town F.C. players
Aston Villa F.C. players
Crystal Palace F.C. players
Queens Park Rangers F.C. players
Folkestone F.C. players